Jack Endino (born Michael M. Giacondino; 1964) is an American producer and musician based in Seattle, Washington. Long associated with Seattle label Sub Pop and the grunge movement, Endino worked on seminal albums from bands including Mudhoney, Soundgarden and Nirvana. He was also the guitarist for Seattle band Skin Yard, which was active between 1985 and 1992. Endino currently manages a studio in Seattle called Soundhouse Recording.

Early career
In 1985, Endino and Daniel House started the grunge band Skin Yard. Though originally a drummer, Endino played guitar and Matt Cameron played drums until he left for Soundgarden. In 1986, Skin Yard contributed two songs to C/Z Records' grunge compilation Deep Six. In July 1986, Endino left his basement recording studio to found Reciprocal Recording with Chris Hanzsek, the Deep Six sound engineer, where he used his self-taught recording skills to produce, engineer, and mix Skin Yard's 1987 debut album Skin Yard. His skill and low fees meant that he was soon an engineer of choice for up-and-coming Seattle grunge bands, and in 1988, he recorded Nirvana's debut album Bleach in 30 hours for $606.17, using  reel-to-reel 8-track machine. The album did well in the underground, and after the success of 1991's Nevermind it went platinum. After Reciprocal Recording closed in July 1991, Endino continued as a freelance producer and engineer, producing several albums including Bruce Dickinson's Skunkworks. He appeared in the 1996 grunge documentary Hype!, where he's humorously referred to as "the godfather of grunge." Endino was also interviewed at length for the 2009 book, Grunge is Dead: The Oral History of Seattle Rock Music.

Recording and production work 
See Jack Endino discography for a chronological list of Endino's recording and production work
Endino is known for his stripped down recording practices and his dislike of over-produced music with effects and remastering. Largely because of the success of albums like Soundgarden's Screaming Life and Nirvana's Bleach in the mainstream, the resulting raw, unpolished sound is still seen as a defining characteristic of the grunge movement.

As an artist
Endino released his first solo album, Angle of Attack, in 1989. Skin Yard disbanded in 1992, and he released a second solo album, Endino's Earthworm, in 1993. In October 2005, he released his third solo album, Permanent Fatal Error. 

He is currently second guitarist in the band Kandi Coded, which also features Volcom snowboarding pro Jamie Lynn. He also plays bass in Seattle band Slippage. In March 2013, Fin Records released Endino's EP Rumble, featuring a cover of the April 1958 single "Rumble" by Link Wray & His Ray Men. Since 2015, Endino has played lead guitar in Seattle rock band MKB ULTRA, and also with the improv-psych trio Beyond Captain Orca.

References

External links

Full discography with notes and album covers
Jack Endino Interview on RocknRollDating.com

1964 births
Living people
American audio engineers
American male singer-songwriters
American rock songwriters
American rock singers
American rock bass guitarists
American rock drummers
American rock guitarists
American male bass guitarists
Record producers from Connecticut
Grunge musicians
20th-century American drummers
American male drummers
20th-century American bass guitarists
Skin Yard members
20th-century American male musicians
American singer-songwriters